Gordon "Gordie" Robertson (June 25, 1926 – October 10, 2019) was a Canadian ice hockey player. He was a member of the Edmonton Mercurys team, which won a gold medal at the 1952 Winter Olympics in Oslo, Norway. Robertson died in October 2019 at the age of 93.

External links
Olympics Database page

References

1926 births
2019 deaths
Canadian ice hockey right wingers
Ice hockey people from British Columbia
Ice hockey players at the 1952 Winter Olympics
Medalists at the 1952 Winter Olympics
Olympic gold medalists for Canada
Olympic ice hockey players of Canada
Olympic medalists in ice hockey
Sportspeople from Castlegar, British Columbia